The 1983 Copa América Final was the final match to determine the champion of the 1983 Copa América, the 32nd. edition of this continental competition. The final was played in the two-legged tie system, with the team earning more points being the champion. The first leg was held on October 27 in Estadio Centenario of Montevideo, where Uruguay beat Brazil 2–0. In the second leg, held on November 4 in Estádio Fonte Nova in Salvador, both teams tied 0–0. 

Uruguay was crowned champion winning 3–1 on points (plus 2–0 on aggregate), therefore achieving their 12th. Copa América title.

Qualified teams

Venues

Route to the final 

Notes
 Uruguay won 2–1 on aggregate
 Brazil qualified on a drawing of lots

Match details

First leg

Second leg

References

1983 Copa América
1983 in South American football
1983 in Brazilian football
1983 in Uruguayan football
Uruguay national football team matches
Brazil national football team matches
Brazil–Uruguay football rivalry
October 1983 sports events in South America
November 1983 sports events in South America
Copa América finals